The Medal for the War Wounded was originally a mere insignia in the form of an ribbon awarded for wounds received in the line of duty while facing an enemy. The insignia was established by the law of 11 December 1916, based on an idea by the nationalist writer Maurice Barrès. Although originally established as a temporary measure, the insignia survived for a century in some form or another. It could be awarded to wounded soldiers, prisoners of war, to World War II deportees and internees from the French resistance and to soldiers wounded in more recent conflicts.  A variety of unofficial medals in the form of a red enamelled star suspended by the same ribbon appeared very early on and although tolerated for wear by the authorities, were not official until recently.

A provisional instruction of 14 April 2015 from the French Army High Command began the proceedings which were later ratified in the official decree n° 2016-1130 of 17 August 2016 making the Medal for the War Wounded a state decoration of the French Republic.  A recent 2017 amendment further simplified the regulations of this award by allowing all past recipients to keep wearing it but strictly limiting any future award to military personnel.

Statute
The Medal for the War Wounded can be worn by:
Military personnel suffering from a physical or mental war wound, ascertained by the army health service and approved by the Minister of Defence;
Prisoners of war, physically or psychologically wounded during their detention.

Article 3 of the new regulation states that the wear of this medal is not subordinate to an official ceremony of award.

Article 4 of the new regulation further states that persons who were eligible for and wore the now defunct insignia as mentioned in Article 2 of the now abrogated 1952 law governing its wear (resistance deportees and internees), may wear the medal.

Award description
The Medal for the War Wounded is made of gilded bronze with a 30 mm diameter.  It is mainly composed of a large bright red enamelled five pointed star atop a crown of half laurels (left) and half oak leaves (right).

The medal is suspended by a ring from a 35 mm wide silk moiré ribbon composed of vertical stripes in the following colours: white 1 mm - blue 5 mm - white 1 mm - blue 4 mm - white 1 mm - yellow 3 mm - white 1 mm - beginning ou the outer edge on both sides of a 3 mm wide central red stripe.

Small enamel red five pointed stars are added to the medal ribbon and undress ribbon for each additional wound.

Notable recipients (partial list)

Sergeant André Maginot
General Pierre Billotte
Major Hélie de Saint Marc
General Raoul Salan
Resistance fighter André Girard
General Edgard de Larminat
Foreign Legion Captain John Freeman "Jack" Hasey
Lieutenant-Colonel Pierre Clostermann
Sergeant Eugene Bullard
Captain Pierre-Eugène Fournier
General Gilbert Henry
Lieutenant Jean Carrelet de Loisy
Major Jean-Edmond Lamaze
Lieutenant-Colonel Alfred Maurice Cazaud
Lieutenant-Colonel Jean Vérines
General Félix de Vial

See also

 List of wound decorations

References

External links
Military Wounded Insignia on France Phaléristique (In French)

Military awards and decorations of France
Wound decorations
Awards established in 1916
Awards established in 2016
Maurice Barrès